Amanda Walsh (born October 3, 1981) is a Canadian actress, writer, and former VJ for the Canadian television station MuchMusic.

Early life
Walsh was born in Rigaud, Quebec. She went to Hudson High School, in Hudson, Quebec.

Career
Walsh started her acting career "acting" out of border-crossing scenarios at the Canada Customs college in her hometown of Rigaud. Walsh began working as a professional actor at age 12. She has dabbled in sketches and stand-up comedy, with numerous TV appearances. She won a gold medal win at the 2000 Improv Games in Quebec as a member of the "8 People" troupe. An honours graduate from John Abbott College, Creative Arts program (in Ste. Anne de Bellevue), she maintains an interest in TV production and music, and at 16 co-produced a documentary on the swing revival. Between acting jobs, open mic nights doing stand-up, creating video comedies with her friends, and learning to play the fiddle, she held a part-time job as a waitress in Hudson, Quebec. 

She co-starred in the straight-to-video film WarGames: The Dead Code (2008). She was also in an episode of Are You Afraid of the Dark?

MuchMusic
Walsh was "discovered" by a MuchMusic producer while waiting tables in Hudson, Quebec. He encouraged her to send a video and apply for the job. She got it and became the youngest VJ in MuchMusic history at the age of nineteen. She has hosted or co-hosted many programmes including  Much Top Tens, Electric Circus, MuchOnDemand, Fandemonium and others. She left MuchMusic in 2004 to pursue an acting career.

2000s work
Walsh has since made appearances on shows such as Smallville, and the night time soap opera Train 48. In 2005, she starred opposite David Boreanaz in the movie These Girls, based on the play by Vivienne Laxdale. That movie was shown at the 2005 Toronto International Film Festival. She had a small role in the movie "Stardom (2000)" playing an overenthusiastic VJ on a parody of the Canadian music channel MuchMusic.

After moving to Los Angeles, Walsh got a starring role in the ABC mid-season replacement Sons and Daughters, which premiered March 7, 2006 on ABC.  The show was canceled in late-April after ten aired episodes.

Walsh appeared on an episode of Veronica Mars and also had a minor role in the film Disturbia. She portrayed Katie in the original pilot for the sitcom The Big Bang Theory, but was replaced by Kaley Cuoco (as Penny) in the second pilot.
In 2007, she had a role in the ABC movie Full of It as Vikki Sanders. 
In 2008, Walsh had a role in the Internet series The Remnants with Ze Frank. She can be seen in the 2009 comedy film Ghosts of Girlfriends Past. In 2010, she appeared in ABC Family's Beauty and the Briefcase playing Hilary Duff's best friend Joanne. In 2011, Walsh appeared in an episode of the Showcase series Single White Spenny as well as a minor appearance on the ABC crime drama Castle. She made a brief appearance as Natalie Haverstraw in an episode of Grimm entitled Of Mouse and Man in 2012. She has also appeared in season 10, episode 5 of Two and a Half Men as Dawn, in season 10, episode 3 of NCIS as Ellen Roberts, and in season 1, episode 12 of The Mob Doctor as Chloe. In 2014–15, she appeared in 10 episodes of Lost Girl as Elizabeth Helm/Zee. In 2017, she appeared in the second season of  Dirk Gently's Holistic Detective Agency in the central role of Suzie Boreton.

Filmography

Film

Television

References

External links

1981 births
Actresses from Quebec
Canadian child actresses
Canadian film actresses
Canadian television actresses
Living people
Much (TV channel) personalities
People from Montérégie
Anglophone Quebec people
20th-century Canadian actresses
21st-century Canadian actresses
Canadian VJs (media personalities)
Canadian women television personalities